Speke may refer to:

Speke is a district in Liverpool, England
Speke (surname)
Mount Speke, a mountain in the Ruwenzori Range, Uganda
, a Uganda Railway paddle steamer named after John Hanning Speke
SPEKE (cryptography) (Simple Password Exponential Key Exchange), cryptographic protocol
Speke baronets
Speke (ship), a number of ships with the same name